Claus Ebbe Bjørn (7 October 1944 – 18 April 2005) was a Danish author, historian, and television and radio broadcaster, who was Associate Professor of Agricultural History at the University of Copenhagen, Chairman of the Danish Agricultural History Society and Member of the Royal Danish Society of the History of the Fatherland.

Life 
Bjørn was born in Frederiksberg, Copenhagen, Denmark, in 1944. He became mag.art. in History from the University of Copenhagen in 1970 and was employed as a part-time teacher at Rødovre State School (1965–71). On 1 September 1971, he was employed as an amanuensis, and later as Associate professor of Agricultural History in the Department of History at the University of Copenhagen. From 1983 to 1995, he was Chairman of the Danish Agricultural History Society (Landbohistorisk Selskab). He edited the magazine :da:Fortid og Nutid (Past and Present) (1975–85) and the multi-volume work, The History of Danish Agriculture (Det Danske landbrugs historie), I–IV (1988–89), where he himself treated the period from 1810 to 1860.

Bjørn was Treasurer of the Danish Agricultural History Society (Landbohistorisk Selskab), (1973–77), vice-chairman (1977–83), and chairman (1983–95). He was also a Member of the Board of the Danish Joint Historical Council (Dansk Historisk Fællesforening) from 1974 to 1987, and deputy chairman of the Agricultural Historical Support Circle (Landbohistorisk Støttekreds) from 1983 to 1995. He was elected a Member of Member of the Royal Danish Society of the History of the Fatherland (Det kongelige danske Selskab for Fædrelandets Historie) in 1989.

His most important research was in the field of agricultural history in relation to Denmark's political history in the 19th century. He also published a number of biographies, including those of the social democratic Prime Minister, H. C. Hansen, the Chief Justice Christian Colbjørnsen, and the statesman Christian D. F. Reventlow. In his later years, he became more widely known to the public for commentating on television and radio including for royal events such as the funeral of Queen Ingrid of Denmark in 2000 and the Wedding of Crown Prince Frederik of Denmark in 2004. He died in Hørsholm, Denmark, in 2005.

Publications 
  PDF

References 

1944 births
2005 deaths
University of Copenhagen alumni
20th-century Danish historians
21st-century Danish historians
Historians of Denmark